Abdulrahman Abdulqadir Fiqi (born 7 September 1988) is a Qatari Paralympic athlete. He won the silver medal in the men's shot put F34 event at the 2016 Summer Paralympics held in Rio de Janeiro, Brazil. He also won the bronze medal in the men's shot put F34 event at the 2020 Summer Paralympics held in Tokyo, Japan.

In 2017, he won the gold medal in the men's shot put F34 event at the World Para Athletics Championships held in London, United Kingdom.

He was the flag bearer for Qatar during the 2020 Summer Paralympics Parade of Nations as part of the opening ceremony of the 2020 Summer Paralympics.

References

External links
 

Living people
1988 births
People from Doha
Qatari male shot putters
Athletes (track and field) at the 2012 Summer Paralympics
Athletes (track and field) at the 2016 Summer Paralympics
Athletes (track and field) at the 2020 Summer Paralympics
Medalists at the 2016 Summer Paralympics
Medalists at the 2020 Summer Paralympics
Paralympic bronze medalists for Qatar
Paralympic medalists in athletics (track and field)
Paralympic athletes of Qatar
World Para Athletics Championships winners